The Lubbock metropolitan area is a metropolitan statistical area (MSA) in the South Plains region of West Texas, United States, that covers three counties – Crosby, Lubbock, and Lynn. As of the 2010 census, the Lubbock MSA had a population of 290,805, though a 2019 estimate placed the population at 322,257, which ranks it the 157th-most populated MSA in the United States. It is also part of the larger Lubbock-Plainview-Levelland combined statistical area.

Communities

Places with more than 150,000 people
Lubbock (Principal city)

Places with 5,000 to 10,000 people
Slaton

Places with 1,000 to 5,000 people
Abernathy (partial)
Crosbyton
Idalou
Lorenzo
Ralls
Ransom Canyon
Shallowater
Tahoka
Wolfforth

Places with less than 1,000 people
Buffalo Springs
New Deal
New Home
O'Donnell
Reese Center

Unincorporated places
Acuff
Cone
Grassland
Kalgary
Roosevelt
Slide
Wayside
Woodrow

Demographics

As of the census of 2020, 321,368 people, 120,841 households, and
73,302 families lived in the MSA. The racial makeup of the MSA was 61.8% White (49.8% non-Hispanic Whites), 8.1% African American, 1.0% Native American, 3.0% Asian, 11.68% from other races, and 13.9% from two or more races. Hispanics or Latinos of any race were 35.6% of the population.

In 2000, the median income for a household in the MSA was $28,984 and for a family was $35,479. Males had a median income of $26,868 versus $19,410 for females. The per capita income for the MSA was $15,884.

See also
List of cities in Texas
 List of museums in West Texas
Texas census statistical areas
List of Texas metropolitan areas

References

 
Geography of Lubbock County, Texas
Geography of Crosby County, Texas
Geography of Lubbock, Texas